Marinna is a locality in Junee Shire in southern New South Wales, Australia. Its main feature is a grain silo on the Main South railway line. A station was opened in the locality between 1897 and 1975.

Marinna Post Office opened on 7 December 1925 and closed in 1968.

Marinna railway station

References

Towns in the Riverina
Towns in New South Wales
Main Southern railway line, New South Wales